George Johnson (November 1871 – 1934) was an English footballer who played in the Football League for Aston Villa and Walsall.

References

1871 births
1934 deaths
English footballers
English Football League players
West Bromwich Albion F.C. players
Walsall F.C. players
Aston Villa F.C. players
Plymouth Argyle F.C. players
Crystal Palace F.C. players
Association football forwards